Seconds Out is the second live album by English progressive rock band Genesis. It was released as a double album on 14 October 1977 on Charisma Records, and was their first with touring drummer Chester Thompson and their last with guitarist Steve Hackett. The majority was recorded in June 1977 at the Palais des Sports in Paris during the Wind & Wuthering Tour. One track, "The Cinema Show", was recorded in 1976 at the Pavillon de Paris during their A Trick of the Tail Tour.

Seconds Out received average to positive reviews upon its release, and reached No. 4 in the UK and No. 47 in the US. Hackett left the group to pursue a solo career while the album was being mixed, reducing Genesis to a core trio of keyboardist Tony Banks, guitarist/bassist Mike Rutherford, and drummer and singer Phil Collins. Seconds Out was reissued in 1994 and 2009, the latter as part of the Genesis Live 1973–2007 box set.

Background

In July 1977, the Genesis line-up of lead singer and drummer Phil Collins, keyboardist Tony Banks, bassist Mike Rutherford, guitarist Steve Hackett, and touring drummer Chester Thompson finished a seven-month tour supporting Wind & Wuthering (1976). For their next step, the group began the process of selecting live recordings that they had assembled in 1976 and 1977 for an official release and their first since Genesis Live (1973).

Seconds Out is compiled mostly from the band's four dates at the Palais des Sports in Paris between 11–14 June 1977. Collins said the group considered the recordings made that year were superior in quality than the ones taken a year prior, and that his singing and Banks's keyboards sounded better compared to the previous tour. The run of shows in Paris allowed the band to spend more time on getting their performance and quality of the recordings right. One track, "The Cinema Show", was recorded at the Pavillon de Paris on 23 June 1976 during the 1976 tour supporting A Trick of the Tail (1976). This tour featured Bill Bruford on drums. Mixes of "Firth of Fifth", "Los Endos", "I Know What I Like (In Your Wardrobe)", and "White Mountain" from 1976 were produced, but scrapped. The band recorded performances of "Inside and Out" from the EP Spot the Pigeon, but were unable to get the song to sound as good as the studio version. "I Know What I Like" contains a snippet of the 1953 song "I Love Paris".

The album's credits include details of which drummer(s) are playing on each song. Mixed in with these credits are the notes "Robbery Assault & Battery – keyboard solo Phil" and "Cinema Show – Bill Bruford, Phil keyboard solo". This should be read to mean that Collins played the drum kit (along with Thompson or Bruford) during that solo, not that Collins played keyboards.

Hackett's departure
When Seconds Out was announced in the press on 8 October 1977, the news coincided with Hackett's departure from Genesis. He had announced his decision to the group two months earlier while cuts for the album were selected and mixed. Collins recalled spotting Hackett on the street while on his way to the studio and offered him a lift, but Hackett declined. Collins found out from Banks and Rutherford that Hackett had quit. Hackett later said that if he had got in the car, Collins would have been the one person to make him reconsider.

On the 1990 documentary video Genesis – A History, Banks joked that Hackett was mixed out of Seconds Out as a result. Although Hackett's guitar is audible, it lacks the volume of previous albums or rough soundboard mix bootlegs from the 1977 tour.

Release
Seconds Out was released on 14 October 1977. Charisma Records organised an extensive promotional campaign for the album that included double page spreads in newspapers, window displays, colour posters, and commercials on national radio. In the US, the album was released by Atlantic Records. It peaked at No. 4 on the UK Albums Chart and No. 47 on the US Billboard 200.

Reception

Hugh Fielder of Sounds gave the album five stars out of five. Melody Maker reporter Chris Welch, with assistance from Bob Gallagher, also praised the album. Rolling Stone praised the contemporary incarnation of the band, noting they had "less reliance on theatrics" than before Peter Gabriel's departure, "and an added dollop of jazz-rock inclinations."

In their retrospective review, AllMusic wrote that Genesis's renderings of songs from A Trick of the Tail and Wind & Wuthering surpass the studio recordings, with "superb vocals by Collins throughout," and drumming by Chester Thompson, which they described as "at least a match for Collins' best playing." They considered the tracks from earlier albums to be weaker, however, finding Collins "...can't match the subtlety or expressiveness of Gabriel's singing, though he comes close."

Foo Fighters drummer Taylor Hawkins has described Seconds Out as "one of my drum bibles" and "one of my favorite-sounding drum records too."

Reissues
In 1994, a digitally remastered version was released on CD by Virgin Records in Europe and by Atlantic Records in the US. Seconds Out was reissued with new stereo and 5.1 surround sound mixes completed by Nick Davis and released as part of the Genesis Live 1973–2007 box set in September 2009. On the original LP, "Dance on a Volcano" and "Los Endos" are banded as one track. This error was corrected on the box set. In November 2012, a 35th anniversary LP was pressed using the 2009 remaster.

Track listing
All songs written by Tony Banks, Phil Collins, Peter Gabriel, Steve Hackett and Mike Rutherford, except where noted.

Notes:
 Some CD copies of the album have an error on the last two songs "Dance on a Volcano" and "Los Endos". "Dance on a Volcano" is 8:26 long instead of 5:09. The last 3:17 that has been added to "Dance on a Volcano" is the first 3:17 of "Los Endos". This makes "Los Endos" only 3:14 long. This error is also on some streaming services such as Apple Music, Spotify (sometimes) and YouTube Music (sometimes).
 On this album, "The Carpet Crawlers" was originally titled "The Carpet Crawl". On Apple Music, it is listed as "The Carpet Crawler"; on Spotify it is listed as "The Carpet Crawlers" and on YouTube Music it is listed as "The Carpet Crawl" (sometimes "The Carpet Crawlers") for unknown reasons.
 All tracks were recorded during the band's 1977 tour in support of the Wind & Wuthering album, except for "The Cinema Show" which was recorded during the 1976 tour in support of A Trick of the Tail as it was not performed on the 1977 tour.

Personnel
Credits taken from the album's sleeve notes.

Genesis
Tony Banks – RMI Electra piano, Hammond T. organ, ARP Pro Soloist, Mellotron 400, Epiphone 12-string guitar, backing vocals
Mike Rutherford – Shergold electric 12-string and bass guitar, 8-string bass guitar, Alvarez 12-string guitar, Moog Taurus bass pedals, backing vocals
Steve Hackett – Gibson Les Paul, Hokada 12-string guitar
Phil Collins – lead vocals, Premier and Gretsch drums

with
Chester Thompson – Pearl drums, percussion (except "The Cinema Show")
Bill Bruford – Ludwig and Hayman drums, percussion ("The Cinema Show" only)

Production
Genesis – production
David Hentschel – production
Neil Ross – assistant production
Armando Gallo – sleeve photos
Robert Ellis – sleeve photos
Graham Wood – sleeve photos
A&D Design – sleeve layout
Frank Sanson – art direction
Tony Smith – management
Alex Sim – management
Brian Murray-Smith – management

Charts

Weekly charts

Year-end charts

Certifications

References

Notes

Albums produced by David Hentschel
Genesis (band) live albums
1977 live albums
Atlantic Records live albums
Virgin Records live albums
Charisma Records live albums
Albums produced by Phil Collins
Albums produced by Tony Banks (musician)
Albums produced by Mike Rutherford